The 1901 UCI Track Cycling World Championships were the World Championship for track cycling. They took place in Berlin, Germany from 7 to 14 July 1901. Four events for men were contested, two for professionals and two for amateurs.

Medal summary

Medal table

References

Track cycling
UCI Track Cycling World Championships by year
Sports competitions in Berlin
1901 in track cycling
International cycle races hosted by Germany
July 1901 sports events
1900s in Berlin